Major General Sir Hubert Elvin Rance  (17 July 1898 – 24 January 1974) was a British politician who was the last Governor of British Burma between 1946 and 1948, during the transition from Japanese to British colonial administration. Later he became Governor of Trinidad and Tobago.

Career to 1945

Rance was educated at Wimbledon College, joined the British Army in 1916 and fought in the First World War with the Worcestershire Regiment. Later he transferred to the Signal Corps and in the Second World War played a part in the evacuation of Dunkirk in a senior role with the British Expeditionary Force. He also held senior War Office posts directing army training.

Burma

In 1945, he was appointed Director of Civil Affairs in Burma, restoring British control after Japanese forces withdrew. Sir Reginald Dorman-Smith was appointed Governor in 1946, but British Prime Minister Attlee, advised by The 1st Viscount Mountbatten of Burma, soon decided that Rance should replace him. Dorman-Smith's imprisonment of a popular nationalist leader, Aung San, had provoked anger and the threat of rebellion against the British, while Rance had a more conciliatory approach.

British policy started to move away from an attempt at a slow, gradual transition to independence, and it was decided that Rance should co-operate with Aung San and his Anti-Fascist People's Freedom League. Aung San was believed to be less hostile to British interests, and less radical in his nationalism than some other political figures, like the communists, for example.

Rance became Governor on the last day of August 1946, and on 27 January 1947 Attlee made an agreement with  Aung San that independence would come as soon as possible, with elections in April. British hopes of a smooth handover of power allowing the UK to retain some influence were threatened when Aung San was assassinated in July 1947. Rance's prompt action in making U Nu the Prime Minister within hours is believed to have been a decisive factor in avoiding greater upheaval.

In a formal ceremony on 4 January 1948, Governor Rance handed over to Sao Shwe Thaik, 1st President of Burma, while Nu continued as Prime Minister. By the time he left Burma, Rance had retired from the army. His formal title was Major General Sir Hubert Elvin Rance, GBE, CB, and, in 1948, he was made a GCMG. New Burma Government honorably awarded Agga Maha Thray Sithu title to him as one of the foremost holders.

West Indies

He acted as British governor of Trinidad and Tobago between 19 April 1950 and June 1955.
He is author of two reports published by the Colonial Office in London in 1950: Development and welfare in the West Indies, 1947-49 and Report of the British Caribbean Standing Closer Association Committee, 1948-49. In May 1956, he published an article on Burma’s Economic Problems in the Eastern World. 

Hubert Rance Street in Vistabella, San Fernando, Trinidad and Tobago was named in his honour.

Death
Rance died on 24 January 1974 at the age of 75.

References

Sources
Clive Christie, The Karens in Turbulent Times and Enduring People (2000) ed. Jean Michaud
 William Roger Louis, Dissolution of the British Empire in The Oxford History of the British Empire (1999) ed. Brown, Louis, Low
Burma: The Curse of Independence (2001)
British in Burma (Encyclopædia Britannica)
King's College Military Archives
DNB articles on U Nu and Dorman-Smith

Further reading
Time magazine describes Rance's departure from Burma

History of Myanmar
Governors of Trinidad and Tobago
1898 births
1974 deaths
Burma in World War II
Knights Grand Cross of the Order of St Michael and St George
Knights Grand Cross of the Order of the British Empire
Companions of the Order of the Bath
British Army generals
British Army personnel of World War I
British Army personnel of World War II
Administrators in British Burma
Worcestershire Regiment officers
People educated at Wimbledon College
Royal Corps of Signals officers
Place of birth missing
Place of death missing